Unique One is a 2004 Japanese horror film directed by Takashi Shimizu.

Plot
Freelance cameraman Takuyoshi Masuoka (Shinya Tsukamoto) carries a camera everywhere he goes. He becomes obsessed with the idea of fear after seeing a frightened man shove a knife into his eye to commit suicide. Wishing to understand the fear that the man must have felt before his death, Masuoka descends into a labyrinthine underground area beneath the city, where he sees humanoid creatures that walk on their hands and knees and whimper like dogs. While searching the tunnels and passages, Masuoka encounters a homeless inhabitant who warns him about the "Deros". He then meets the ghost of Kuroki, the man who killed himself, and learns more about the underworld. After hours of searching, Masuoka discovers a mountain range with a village built by the underground dwellers. He finds a naked girl (Tomomi Miyashita) chained to a wall. He takes her back to his apartment and notices she doesn't eat, drink, or speak.

The girl, whom Masuoka dubs 'F', appears to be something other than human, and Masuoka becomes obsessed with understanding her. He sets up cameras that enable him to observe her from his cell phone when he leaves the apartment, and checks on her regularly. On a trip to the shopping mall, Masuoka sees F speaking to someone off camera, and a menacing man in black appears behind him. When he returns to the apartment, a woman in a yellow jacket is hiding in the stairway outside his door. Inside, Masuoka finds F in convulsions and unsuccessfully attempts to feed her. He discovers that twelve seconds of camera footage is missing, and receives a mysterious phone call from a payphone warning him that he is in serious trouble.

After being beaten with his camera by a stranger whom he filmed, Masuoka cuts his finger on the broken lens and returns home. He discovers that F survives on blood when she licks his finger, and cuts himself to feed her further. Masuoka begins to care for her by providing animal carcasses, deciding to treat F more as a pet than a human. The woman in yellow confronts him in the street, saying the girl is his daughter Fuyumi and asking where she is. Masuoka denies having a daughter and runs away, returning to the apartment to find it has been broken into and F has vanished. He wanders the streets searching for F and encounters the man in black, who expresses his disappointment in Masuoka's handling of her, speaking to him telepathically in the same voice as in the phone call. When Masuoka gets back to the apartment, he finds that F has returned and sees her hands are bloody.

When Masuoka leaves his apartment, the woman in yellow follows and demands that he speak to her. He walks to an alley without speaking, and turns his camera on. The woman says she wants to see her girl, at which point Masuoka stabs her to death. Later, he murders a young girl whom he met under the pretense of filming pornography. He drains their blood into bottles and feeds it to F. Masuoka calls the payphone and speaks to the stranger, who agrees that Masuoka is taking better care of F now. While filming for a news crew at the scene of the second murder, Masuoka sees a woman he filmed in her apartment previously. He takes F out of the apartment, and leaves her in a karaoke room to travel on his own for a period. Sitting on a dock, Masuoka discusses his interest in fear with Kuroki.

Masuoka becomes homeless and sleeps in the park where he killed the young girl. He briefly admits to himself that he murdered his wife and a stranger and treated his daughter like an animal, before seeing a pair of Deros and finding a cell phone that leads him back to his apartment to find F. His wife's ghost appears behind Masuoka in the elevator, and he enters the apartment to find F weak on the floor. F speaks to him for the first time, and he cuts his tongue out to feed her. At the end of the film, F leads Masuoka back down into the underworld, and films him as it appears he has finally discovered the same fear that initially intrigued him.

Cast

Shinya Tsukamoto as Masuoka
Tomomi Miyashita as F
Kazuhiro Nakahara as Arei Furoki
Miho Ninagawa as Aya Fukumoto
Shun Sugata as MIB

Critical analysis

At different points in the film, different explanations are given for what is happening to Masuoka.  Early conversations in the film seem to suggest that the tunnels and F herself may be a physical manifestation of human ideas.  The film repeatedly references dangerous creatures called the Dero who live underground, named after the "detrimental robots" in Richard Sharpe Shaver's A Warning to Future Man.  At a later point in the film, it is suggested that Masuoka is insane and delusional, perhaps because he has stopped taking Prozac, and that his delusions have led him to kill innocent people and treat his daughter like an animal.  The end of the film offers no concrete explanation.

In their book Lurker in the Lobby: A Guide to the Cinema of H. P. Lovecraft, Andrew Migliore and John Strysik write: "Marebito is a very good film that wears its influences proudly, without suffocating in their embrace. It's neither an adaptation nor an homage, but it swells with inspiration from Lovecraft's work. It's unconventional, free from cliché, and redolent with sinister insinuations that never become clear. You know them only by their shadows."

Production

The film was made on digital video between the shooting of Ju-on: The Grudge and The Grudge.

See also
Richard Sharpe Shaver
Kaspar Hauser
Peeping Tom
Feral child
Agartha

References

External links
 
 
 

2004 horror films
2004 films
Films directed by Takashi Shimizu
Japanese horror films
Japanese supernatural horror films
Films about the Hollow Earth
2000s Japanese films